Alex Schalk (born 7 August 1992) is a Dutch professional footballer who plays as a forward or a winger for Japanese club Urawa Red Diamonds. He scored the winning goal for Ross County in the 2015–16 Scottish League Cup final.

Career
Schalk came through the youth ranks of NAC Breda, earning the nickname of "Der Bomber van Breda" because of his reputation as a footballer with remarkable goalscoring instincts, comparable to legendary German striker Gerd Müller. On 1 May 2011, he made his senior debut for NAC against Heracles Almelo in the 33rd round of the 2010–11 Eredivisie season, replacing Ömer Bayram in the 85th minute. The match ended in a 2–1 home loss. On 9 August 2011, Schalk agreed to a new two-year contract at NAC until June 2013.

After losing perspective on playing matches for NAC Breda, Schalk was sent on loan to PSV, where he played for Eerste Divisie side Jong PSV. He scored six times in 16 matches for the Eerste Divisie side. On 28 June 2014, Schalk signed a one-year deal with Eredivisie side Go Ahead Eagles on a free transfer.

Schalk moved to Scottish Premiership club Ross County in October 2015. On 13 March 2016, he scored a late winner as Ross County won their first major silverware with a 2–1 victory over Hibernian in the Scottish League Cup final. On 16 April 2017, in the 88th minute of a Premiership match at home to Celtic, he won a penalty which was converted to earn Ross County a 2–2 draw. The act was described as a "clear dive" while Celtic manager Brendan Rodgers accused Schalk of "blatant cheating". Days later, he was charged with committing an "act of simulation" and handed a two-game suspension by the Scottish Football Association's compliance officer which both he and his club accepted.

After Ross County were relegated to the Scottish Championship, Schalk was allowed to leave and join the Swiss side Servette.  He made headlines in October 2019 after giving the middle finger to FC Sion fans after scoring a goal. As a result, he was suspended for two games.

On 25 March 2022, Schalk signed with Urawa Red Diamonds in Japan.

Career statistics

Honours
Ross County
Scottish League Cup: 2015–16

Servette 
Swiss Challenge League: 2018–19

References

External links
 Voetbal International profile 
 Netherlands stats at OnsOranje 
 Profile at Eurosport.com

1992 births
Living people
Footballers from Breda
Association football forwards
Dutch footballers
Eredivisie players
Eerste Divisie players
NAC Breda players
PSV Eindhoven players
Go Ahead Eagles players
Ross County F.C. players
Servette FC players
Urawa Red Diamonds players
Scottish Professional Football League players
Swiss Super League players
Swiss Challenge League players
Dutch expatriate footballers
Dutch expatriate sportspeople in Scotland
Expatriate footballers in Scotland
Dutch expatriate sportspeople in Switzerland
Expatriate footballers in Switzerland
Dutch expatriate sportspeople in Japan
Expatriate footballers in Japan